Renata Ruiz Pérez (born 9 May 1984) is a Chilean model. She was the winner of the contest Elite Model Look Chile 2001. In September of the same year she took part in the international contest (Nice, France), where she competed with more than 60 delegates of 40 countries. The winner was the Dutch Rianne Ten Haken, and Ruiz was the 1st runner-up. The third position was for another Dutch, Femke Lakenman.

Ruiz represented Chile in Miss Universe 2005 in Thailand. She was elected under the organization of Ana Maria Cummins and Francisco Zegers. She did not place in the pageant, which was won by Canadian Natalie Glebova.

Filmography

Radio 
Canciones Play (Play FM) 
Mapa Play (Play FM) 
Ciudad Rock & Pop (Rock & Pop) (2013–present)
La Picá de Uno (Radio Uno) (2014) (guest)

Televisión 
Algo esta pasando (Chilevisión) (2014)

References

External links
 Renata Ruiz / Official Renata Ruiz website
 Elite Chile
 Renata Ruiz during the Miss Universe 2005 Pageant
 Renata's Book, Elite Model Chile

 

1984 births
Chilean female models
Living people
Miss Universe 2005 contestants
Miss Universo Chile winners
People from Santiago